Damiano Caruso (born 12 October 1987) is an Italian professional road bicycle racer, who currently rides for UCI WorldTeam . Caruso was also the 2008 under-23 Italian national champion for the road race. He competed at the 2020 Summer Olympics, in the road race.

Career
In October 2011, the Italian National Olympic Committee (CONI) requested for Caruso to be suspended from competition for two years, although backdated from December 2010, in relation to a doping offence in 2007. He was given a backdated one-year ban in February 2012, allowing for him to return to competition without being banned, but all his 2011 results were voided. Caruso held the lead of the young rider classification at the 2012 Giro d'Italia, after 's Peter Stetina lost time on the eighth stage.

At the end of 2014, Caruso scored a top-10 placing in the Vuelta a España, finishing ninth in the general classification. In 2015, Caruso finished eighth in the Giro d'Italia, before he was named in the start list for the Tour de France for the first time. Caruso rode each of the following five editions of the race.

Bahrain–Merida (2019–present)
In August 2018,  announced that Caruso would join them from 2019 on an initial two-year contract, with a continued focus on riding as a domestique in Grand Tours and to take opportunities as a team leader in some shorter stage races. During the 2019 Giro d'Italia, both he and teammate Domenico Pozzovivo rode as mountain domestiques for team leader and general classification favourite Vincenzo Nibali; Nibali finished the race in second place overall. During the 2020 Tour de France he rode well with Mikel Landa, who finished in fourth place, as Caruso finished in tenth place overall, his first such placing at the Tour de France.

However on stage five, Landa was involved in a crash that left him with multiple fractures and had to withdraw from the race. As a result, Caruso became ' highest-placed rider on the general classification, and moved onto the overall podium at the halfway point of the race. In the final five road stages, Caruso took four top-five stage placings, culminating in a stage victory on the penultimate day. In second place overall, and trailing race leader Egan Bernal by two-and-a-half minutes, Caruso attacked with  remaining and caught up to the remnants of the breakaway, along with teammate Pello Bilbao. Caruso outlasted Romain Bardet on the final climb, the Alpe Motta, and soloed to his first Grand Tour stage win. Bernal finished second on the stage, limiting his losses to half a minute, and held an almost two-minute lead going into the final stage individual time trial. Caruso took another 30 seconds on that stage, confirming his second-place overall finish. During the Vuelta a España Caruso went on a  solo attack and won the mountainous stage nine in Andalusia. He finished in 17th overall, and in conjunction with the performances of teammates Gino Mäder and Jack Haig, who both placed in the top-five overall,  won the teams classification. He signed a two-year contract extension with the team in October, with an additional year's extension confirmed the following month.

He entered the 2022 Tour de France intending to ride for Haig, but Haig abandoned the Tour in the first week. Together with Luis León Sánchez the pair were making a strong showing for Team Bahrain-Victorious, being active in breakaways and both likely on pace to finish in the top 20. Unfortunately he was forced to quit the Tour late in the race because of COVID. Of the previous fifteen grand tours he entered he finished every single one.

Major results

2005
 1st  Overall Tre Ciclistica Bresciana Junior
1st Stage 2
 5th Overall Giro della Lunigiana
2007
 4th Overall Giro della Toscana
1st  Young rider classification
 8th Trofeo Gianfranco Bianchin
 9th Trofeo Banca Popolare di Vicenza
2008
 1st  Road race, National Under-23 Road Championships
 3rd Gran Premio Industria e Commercio Artigianato Carnaghese
 3rd Gran Premio Città di Camaiore
 6th Giro Del Canavese
 9th Overall Tour de l'Avenir
 9th Trofeo Banca Popolare di Vicenza
 10th Road race, UCI Under-23 Road World Championships
2009
 1st  Overall Giro Delle Pesche Nettarine Di Romagna
1st Stage 5
 1st Trofeo Comune di Cafasse
 1st Stage 2 Giro Ciclistico d'Italia
 4th Trofeo Banca Popolare di Vicenza
 10th Road race, UCI Under-23 Road World Championships
2010
 5th Overall Giro di Sardegna
 5th Giro dell'Appennino
 7th Overall Brixia Tour
 7th Overall Settimana Internazionale di Coppi e Bartali
 10th Overall Giro del Trentino
2011

4th Overall Giro della Provincia di Reggio Calabria
 6th Gran Premio Città di Camaiore

 7th Japan Cup
2012
 2nd Overall Tour of Britain
 8th GP Miguel Induráin
 8th Gran Premio Nobili Rubinetterie
 9th Giro di Toscana
2013
 1st  Mountains classification, Tour of Beijing
 1st Stage 5 Settimana Internazionale di Coppi e Bartali
 3rd Overall Tour of Alberta
2014
 3rd Overall Tour of Austria
 5th Overall Settimana Internazionale di Coppi e Bartali
 5th Tre Valli Varesine
 6th Overall Tour of Slovenia
 9th Overall Vuelta a España
2015
 1st Stage 9 (TTT) Tour de France
 8th Overall Giro d'Italia
 9th Classic Sud-Ardèche
2016
 1st  Mountains classification, Vuelta a Andalucía
 1st Stage 1 (TTT) Tirreno–Adriatico
 4th Road race, National Road Championships
 5th Overall Tour des Fjords
2017
 1st Stage 1 (TTT) Vuelta a España
 1st Stage 1 (TTT) Tirreno–Adriatico
 2nd Overall Tour de Suisse
 4th Road race, National Road Championships
 4th Overall Tour du Haut Var
 9th Overall Tour La Provence
2018
 1st Stage 3 (TTT) Tour de France
 2nd Overall Tirreno–Adriatico
1st Stage 1 (TTT)
 3rd  Team time trial, UCI Road World Championships
 5th Overall Critérium du Dauphiné
 5th Overall Deutschland Tour
2019
 9th Tre Valli Varesine
2020
 1st Circuito de Getxo
 10th Road race, UCI Road World Championships
 10th Overall Tour de France
2021
 Vuelta a España
1st Stage 9
Held  after Stages 9–13
 2nd Overall Giro d'Italia
1st Stage 20 
 7th Overall UAE Tour
 9th Overall Tour de Romandie
2022
 1st  Overall Giro di Sicilia
1st  Points classification
1st Stages 2 & 4
 4th Overall Critérium du Dauphiné
 6th Overall Tour de Romandie
 7th Overall Tirreno–Adriatico
2023
 7th Overall Vuelta a Andalucía

General classification results timeline

See also
List of doping cases in cycling
List of sportspeople sanctioned for doping offences

References

External links

1987 births
Cyclists at the 2016 Summer Olympics
Cyclists at the 2020 Summer Olympics
Doping cases in cycling
Italian Giro d'Italia stage winners
Italian Vuelta a España stage winners
Italian male cyclists
Italian sportspeople in doping cases
Living people
Olympic cyclists of Italy
People from Ragusa, Sicily
Sportspeople from the Province of Ragusa
Cyclists from Sicily
20th-century Italian people
21st-century Italian people